Mormond Halt railway station was a railway station near New Leeds, Aberdeenshire.

History 
The station was opened as Mormond on 24 April 1865. It was named after Mormond Hill, which was nearby. Its name was changed to Mormond Halt on 1 June 1939. It was reduced to a Saturday only service in 1950 and closed on 2 October 1965.

References

Disused railway stations in Aberdeenshire
Beeching closures in Scotland
Former Great North of Scotland Railway stations
Railway stations in Great Britain opened in 1870
Railway stations in Great Britain closed in 1965
1870 establishments in Scotland
1965 disestablishments in Scotland